Frank Collins was an Australian rugby league footballer who played in the 1940s. He played in the NSWRFL premiership for North Sydney as a winger.

Playing career
Collins began his first grade career in 1942 and in 1943 was part of the North Sydney side which reached the grand final that year against Newtown which Norths lost 34–7. This would prove to be the last grand final North Sydney played in until they exited the competition in 1999. 

Collins also played representative football for NSW City/Sydney firsts in 1942 and 1943 scoring 2 tries in 2 games. Collins retired at the end of the 1945 season.

References

North Sydney Bears players
Rugby league wingers
Year of birth missing
Year of death missing
Rugby league players from Sydney